Janet Yawson (born 3 April 1957) is a retired Ghanaian long jumper.

In 1978 she finished sixth at the Commonwealth Games and won a silver medal at the All-Africa Games. She won the bronze medal at the 1979 African Championships.

Her personal best jump was 6.35 metres, achieved in May 1979 in Kumasi.

References

External links
 
All Athletics profile

1957 births
Living people
Commonwealth Games competitors for Ghana
Athletes (track and field) at the 1978 Commonwealth Games
African Games silver medalists for Ghana
African Games medalists in athletics (track and field)
Athletes (track and field) at the 1978 All-Africa Games

Ghanaian female long jumpers
20th-century Ghanaian women
21st-century Ghanaian women